Irvingly van Eijma (born 9 February 1994) is a Curaçaoan football player who plays for Real Lunet. He also holds Dutch citizenship.

Club career
Van Eijma played in the youth of FC Den Bosch until 2014, after which he left for an unknown Cypriot club. A year later, he returned to the Netherlands and joined the amateurs of RKTVV. With the club he played 4 months in the Tweede Klasse, after which he joined FC Oss in June 2015. He made his professional debut in the Eerste Divisie for FC Oss on 7 August 2015 in a game against FC Emmen. In the summer of 2016, he left FC Oss.

At the end of August 2016, Van Eijma found a new club with Finnish third-class Atlantis FC. At the end of September 2016 he and the Dutch players Salah Aharar, Derwin Martina and Ayoub Ait Afkir were suspected of match fixing by the president of the club. The players denied and left the club. In December, research by de Volkskrant revealed that the players were innocent and the club was a playball of several groups of match fixers.

In January 2017, he joined RKC Waalwijk. On 29 January 2019, Van Eijma then signed with BVV Barendrecht. In the summer 2019, he moved to Belgian club Bocholt VV. Six months later, in January 2020, his contract with the club was terminated. In February it was then confirmed, that Van Eijma would play for Real Lunet from the 2020-21 season alongside former professional player Shuremy Felomina, who also would join the club, and Freek Langermans, who already played their. The three gentlemen was already working together as DJ's outside the pitch.

References

External links
 
 
 
 Irvingly van Eijma at Footballdatabase

1994 births
Living people
Footballers from Tilburg
Dutch people of Curaçao descent
Curaçao footballers
Curaçao expatriate footballers
Curaçao international footballers
TOP Oss players
Eerste Divisie players
Atlantis FC players
Kakkonen players
RKC Waalwijk players
Kozakken Boys players
BVV Barendrecht players
Association football forwards
Curaçao expatriate sportspeople in Belgium
Expatriate footballers in Finland
Expatriate footballers in Belgium